Frank Barry may refer to:

 Frank Barry (footballer), Australian rules footballer 
 F. Russell Barry (1890–1976), Anglican bishop and author

See also
Frank Barrie (born 1936), British actor
Francis Barry (disambiguation)